The National Trust of Western Australia, officially the National Trust of Australia (W.A.), is a statutory authority that delivers heritage services, including conservation and interpretation, on behalf of the Western Australian government and community. It is responsible for managing heritage properties and collections, as well as natural heritage management and education.

It was created in 1959, following the model of the National Trust in England. The trust became a statutory authority through the National Trust of Australia (W.A.) Act 1964, and is part of the National Trust of Australia, along with similar organisation for the other states and territories of Australia.
As an organisation it was registering properties and localities before state heritage legislation was enabled in Western Australia, setting a framework and grounding for governmental preservation and conservation of heritage.

Properties
The National Trust is custodian and owner of a range of historically significant properties:

Anzac Cottage
Avondale Farm
 Avondale Farm Cottages
Bridgedale
Central Greenough
Ellensbrook
East Perth Cemeteries
Golden Pipeline Heritage Trail
Mangowine Homestead
 No 1 Pump Station - Mundaring Weir
Old Blythewood
Peninsula Farm - Maylands
Samson House - Fremantle
Strawberry Hill - Albany
Warden Finnerty’s Residence - Coolgardie
Wonnerup
Woodbridge House - Woodbridge
York Courthouse Complex - York

Registration 

A significant number of historic properties throughout Western Australia were registered by the Trust in the 1970s prior to later registrations by local government and state agencies - an example is Toodyay Court House, which was classified by the Trust on 7 June 1977 and included on the Shire of Toodyay's Municipal Heritage Inventory on 27 August 1998. On 14 February 2003 it was placed on the permanent state heritage register.

References

Further reading

 

 
Organisations based in Perth, Western Australia
Historical societies of Australia
1959 establishments in Australia
Organizations established in 1959